Goryachy Klyuch (Circassian: Псыфаб, lit. warm water; , lit. hot spring) is a town and a balneological resort in Krasnodar Krai, Russia, located on the Psekups River (Kuban's tributary)  south of Krasnodar, the administrative center of the krai. Population:    20,000 (1970).

History
It was established in 1864 and granted town status in 1965.

Administrative and municipal status
Within the framework of administrative divisions, it is, together with thirty rural localities, incorporated as the Town of Goryachy Klyuch—an administrative unit with the status equal to that of the districts. As a municipal division, the Town of Goryachy Klyuch is incorporated as Goryachy Klyuch Urban Okrug.

Climate
Under the Köppen climate classification Goryachy Klyuch has a humid subtropical climate (Cfa). The rainfall is significant throughout the year. It is the lowest average temperature of the whole year.

About  of precipitation falls annually.

References

Notes

Sources

External links
Official website of Goryachy_Klyuch 
Goryachy_Klyuch Business Directory  

Cities and towns in Krasnodar Krai
Kuban Oblast
Spa towns in Russia
1864 establishments in the Russian Empire